The Emergency Medical Services Exemplary Service Medal is a Canadian service medal for Emergency medical service personnel.  The medal honours 20 years of exemplary service by professional pre-hospital emergency medical service personnel.  It is, within the Canadian system of honours, the fifth of the exemplary service medals.

See also
 Canadian order of precedence (decorations and medals)

References

External links
Regulations Governing the Award of the Emergency Medical Services Exemplary Service Medal

Civil awards and decorations of Canada
Law enforcement awards and honors
Long and Meritorious Service Medals of Britain and the Commonwealth